Casablanca American School is a coeducational, nursery through grade twelve private day school in Casablanca, Morocco. It is located in the suburban Californie neighborhood.

History 
The school was founded in 1973  and was the first school in North Africa to offer the International Baccalaureate programme.

Casablanca American School is a member of the Mediterranean Association of Independent Schools, the European Council of International Schools, and is accredited by the New England Association of Schools and Colleges. Casablanca American School is supported by the Office of Overseas Schools of the U.S. Department of State.

Academics 
Casablanca American School has offered the International Baccalaureate curriculum since 1986. Currently, students in grades 11 and 12 can take Higher Level and Standard Level courses in Chemistry, Economics, English A (Language and Literature), History, Math Studies, Mathematics, Physics, Theatre, Visual Arts, Biology, Business Management, French B, French A (Language and Literature), Arabic B, Spanish A, Spanish B, Computer Science. All students complete an Extended Essay and a Theory of Knowledge course, as per International Baccalaureate requirements.

All classes except language classes are taught in English. Students typically graduate with the goal of attending American, British, or European universities. 
It is currently ranked 23rd best school in Africa and Best School of Morocco by the African Association of Education.

Student life
The student body is approximately 90% Moroccan, with the remaining 10% representing a number of different nations. Most students are bilingual and many are trilingual (fluent in English, French, and Arabic).

The students of the school have participated in annual Model United Nations and Harvard Model Congress Europe conferences in several countries.

The school does offers athletics, such as basketball, soccer, badminton, volleyball, swimming, and activities depending on grade levels.

In recent years, the school has developed its performing arts extracurricular offerings. It has hosted a student-run Shakespeare festival and several full-length musicals.

References

International schools in Casablanca
American international schools in Morocco
Educational institutions established in 1973
1973 establishments in Morocco
20th-century architecture in Morocco